Miyashita Dam is a gravity dam on the Tadami River  upstream of Mishima in the Fukushima Prefecture of Japan. It was constructed between 1941 and 1946 for the purpose of hydroelectric power generation. It supplies a 94 MW power station with water.

See also

Yanaizu Dam – located downstream
Uwada Dam – located upstream

References

Dams in Fukushima Prefecture
Hydroelectric power stations in Japan
Dams completed in 1946
Energy infrastructure completed in 1946
Dams on the Tadami River
Gravity dams
1946 establishments in Japan